Colin O'Meara (born August 30, 1963) is a Canadian voice actor who provided the voice of the character Tintin from The Adventures of Tintin television series. Other roles include Sailor Moon, Rupert, Road to Avonlea, one episode of Police Academy, and one episode of Harry and His Bucket Full of Dinosaurs, as well as voicing Wrench in the animated TV show Cadillacs and Dinosaurs.

References

External links
 

1963 births
Living people
Canadian male television actors
Canadian male video game actors
Canadian male voice actors
20th-century Canadian male actors
21st-century Canadian male actors